Ukhu Qhata (Quechua ukhu deep, qhata slope, hillside, "deep slope", Hispanicized spelling Ojocata) is a mountain in the Paryaqaqa mountain range in the Andes of Peru, about  high. It is situated in the Junín Region, Yauli Province, Suitucancha District. Ukhu Qhata lies south-east of the mountains Putka and Qarwachuku, west of the mountain Wallakancha and north-east of the mountain Wayllakancha.

References

Mountains of Peru
Mountains of Junín Region